Abdulla Essa Ahmed Ali Yusuf (born 20 November 2002) is a Bahraini swimmer. He competed in the 2020 Summer Olympics.

References

2002 births
Living people
Swimmers at the 2020 Summer Olympics
Bahraini male swimmers
Olympic swimmers of Bahrain